Heterocrasa is a monotypic snout moth genus described by William Warren in 1896. Its only species, Heterocrasa expansalis, described by the same author in the same year, is found in India.

References

Pyralinae
Monotypic moth genera
Moths of Asia
Pyralidae genera